This is a list of all weapons ever used by the French Army. This list will be organized by era.

World War II 
 List of World War II weapons of France

Cold War 
 List of Cold War weapons and land equipment of France

Present 
 List of equipment of the French Army

References

Military weapons of France
Weapons